Deportivo Amatitlán is a Guatemalan football club  from Amatitlán, Guatemala Department. It was Founded on 30 September 1962 and currently plays on the Segunda División de Ascenso, third tier on Guatemalan football. Originally it was named Finanzas Industriales due to sponsorship by the Ministry of Finance of Guatemala. From 1985 it began to be named Deportivo Amatitlán. The team has participated several times at the highest level. The club also has a women's team.

References 
 Club profile on Soccerway
Club profile on Ceroacero 
Fedefut Guatemala

Football clubs in Guatemala
Association football clubs established in 1962